The Chief Minister of North Eastern Province, Sri Lanka is the elected head of local government at the provincial level, and is vested with most of the executive powers. The Chief Minister is chosen by legislators of the political party or coalition commanding a majority in the provincial council, and serves a six-year term with a provision of re-election. The Governor is the head of province, but his or her role is largely ceremonial.

Chief ministers

See also
 List of Governors of North Eastern Province

References

External links
North Eastern Provincial Council

North Eastern